Eternamente Tuya (lit. Eternally Yours, international title: Forever Yours) is a Mexican telenovela produced by  Oscar Guarín and Azteca, starring Fernanda Romero, Khotan Fernandez, Andrés Palacios, and Verónica Merchant.

Cast 

 Fernanda Romero as Antonia
 Marimar Vega as Sara
 Khotan Fernandez as David
 Andrés Palacios as Juan Pablo
 Veronica Merchant as Águeda
 Irene Arcila as Guadalupe
 Marco Antonio Treviño as Jesús
 Rodolfo Arias as Humberto
 Sergio Kleiner as Chon
 Mario Zaragoza as Ramón
 Juan Pablo Medina
 Ana Belena
 Fernando Becerril
 Fernando Alonso as Roberto
 Carmen Madrid as Ernestina
 Emilio Guerrero as Crispín
 Andrea Escalona as Forencia
 Luis Alberto López as Tiburcio
 Juan David Penágos
 Joanydka Mariel
 Flavio Peniche
 Alfredo Herrera
 Fidel Garriga as Mateo
 Rafael Rojas

External links
 Official website 
 Complete chapters of the telenovela 
 

Mexican telenovelas
2009 telenovelas
Spanish-language telenovelas
2009 Mexican television series debuts
2009 Mexican television series endings
TV Azteca telenovelas